Zanthoxylum coco (also known as Fagara coco) is an evergreen tree of the family Rutaceae, native to  Argentina and Bolivia where it grows in the wild, mostly in spiniferous forests of the low mountain ranges of the western Chaco. It is characteristic of the hill forest of the Sierras Pampeanas.

Description
The coco, also cochucho or smelly sauco, is usually found either in isolated groups or standing alone, from a small to medium-sized tree, ranging from 6 to 8 metres in height. The foliage is abundant, evergreen with imparipinnate leaves that present paired spines presumably in the place of leaflets. Punctations, in pairs, on the leaflets are quite distinctive. Leaves have serrated margins and pinnate venation. Flowers have five petals and are arranged in paniculate inflorescences. The fruit is spherically shaped, dehiscent; containing a shiny blackish seed.
The whole plant has a characteristic unpleasant smell, hence the alternative name "smelly sauco".

Biochemistry
Even though unused in the general botanical pharmacopeia, Zanthoxylum coco tissues are very rich in alkaloids. γ-Fagarine, N-methylisocorydine, skimminianine, α-fagarine, fagarine-2, magnoflorine, nitidine, chelerythrine, berberine, palmatine and candicine have been isolated from the foliage and wood.

Taxon synonym usage
The coco belongs to the genus Zanthoxylum. However, most local scientific articles use Fagara as the genus name.

References

 Hieronymus, G.: (1882), Plantae Diaphoricae Florae Argentinae - Bs. A.s, Ed. Kraft, 53 - 404 pp.
 Domínguez, J. A.: (1928), Contribuciones a la Materia Médica Argentina, Bs. As., Ed. Peuser, 95 - 433 pp.
 Stucker, G.V.: (1930), Contribución al estudio del Fagara coco, Congreso Internacional de Biología, Montevideo, Oct. 1930.
 Fernández Rua, R.: (1933), El alcaloide de la corteza del Fagara coco: la fagaridina, Córdoba, folleto - 12 pp. y tablas.
 Boelcke, O.: (1989) Plantas vasculares de la Argentina - Bs.As., Ed. H. Sur, 2da. reimpresión, 171 - 369 pp.

coco
Trees of Argentina
Trees of Bolivia
Gran Chaco